Justin Brice Luthy (born April 16, 1991) is an American soccer player.

Career

Youth, College and Amateur
Luthy was a member of the Columbus Crew Soccer Academy before spending his entire college career at Boston College.  He made a total 80 appearances for the Eagles and finished with a 1.06 GAA and 25 clean sheets.

Luthy is Boston College's all-time leader in wins (43) and minutes played (7400:43) ... ranks second all-time in shutouts (25) and fourth in saves (301).

His senior year (2012) Luthy started 17 matches in goal and played in 18 ... logged 1,690 minutes in net ... had a 1.01 goals against average and a .756 save percentage ... recorded seven shutouts on the year ... went 3-2-3 in ACC action and played all 780 minutes ... ranked third in the ACC in shutouts and fourth in goals against average, save percentage and saves ... recorded six saves - the second-highest total of the season - in the 1-0 loss at Northeastern (11/15) in the NCAA First Round ... shut out Clemson (11/6) for 110 minutes and made three saves in the ACC Championship ... made two saves in a scoreless draw against Virginia (10/26) ... notched four stops in a 1-0 shutout win at Duke (10/19) ... did not record a save but helped shut out Clemson (10/13) in a scoreless draw ... recorded clean sheets in a 1-0 victories against Dartmouth (10/10) and at No. 15 Wake Forest (10/6) ... made three saves against the Big Green and eight at the Demon Deacons ... made a save in a 1-0 shutout win at Fairfield (9/3) ... recorded five saves in a 2-1 season-opening win at Quinnipiac (9/24).

He also played in the Premier Development League for Portland Timbers U23s.

Professional
On March 26, 2015, Luthy signed a professional contract with USL club Portland Timbers 2.  He made his professional debut three days later in a 3–1 victory over Real Monarchs SLC.

International
Luthy has represented the United States in the U18 and U20 level.

References

External links
T2 bio
Boston College Eagles bio

1991 births
Living people
American soccer players
Boston College Eagles men's soccer players
Portland Timbers U23s players
Portland Timbers 2 players
Colorado Springs Switchbacks FC players
Association football goalkeepers
Soccer players from Ohio
USL League Two players
USL Championship players
United States men's youth international soccer players
United States men's under-20 international soccer players